Chak 376 JB Nai Bassi is a village in the Punjab province of  Pakistan. It is located at 31°5'10N 72°53'50E with an altitude of 174 metres (574 feet). Neighbouring settlements include 376 JB and 319 JB.

References

Populated places in Toba Tek Singh District